The 2019-20 Niagara Purple Eagles men's ice hockey season was the 24th season of play for the program, the 22nd at the Division I level, and the 10th season in the Atlantic Hockey conference. The Purple Eagles represented Niagara University and were coached by Jason Lammers, in his 3rd season.

On March 12, 2020, Atlantic Hockey announced that the remainder of the conference tournament was cancelled due to the coronavirus pandemic.

Roster
As of September 3, 2019.

Standings

Schedule and Results

|-
!colspan=12 style=";" | Exhibition

|-
!colspan=12 style=";" | Regular Season

|-
!colspan=12 style=";" | 
|- align="center" bgcolor="#e0e0e0"
|colspan=12|Tournament Cancelled

Scoring Statistics

Goaltending statistics

Rankings

References

Niagara Purple Eagles men's ice hockey seasons
Niagara Purple Eagles
Niagara Purple Eagles
2019 in sports in New York (state)
2020 in sports in New York (state)